State Highway 55 is a state highway in western Oklahoma. It has no lettered spur routes.

Route description
SH-55 begins at State Highway 34 in Carter, in eastern Beckham Co. It heads east for six miles (10 km), where it meets State Highway 6 and overlaps it to the south. After running along the Beckham/Washita Co. line, it splits off to the east near Retrop. It then meets State Highway 44 in Sentinel. Seven miles later it meets US-183 in Rocky. It then terminates at State Highway 54 in Lake Valley.

Junction list

References

External links
SH-55 at OKHighways

055
Transportation in Beckham County, Oklahoma
Transportation in Washita County, Oklahoma